Hybrid Universe is the fifth album by Japanese singer and voice actress Nana Mizuki, released on 3 May 2006.

Track listing

Lyrics: HIBIKI
Composition, arrangement: Hitoshi Fujima (Elements Garden)
Ending theme for TV Asahi program Selection X
Faith 
Lyrics: Akiko Watanabe
Composition, arrangement: Kouji Gotou
WILD EYES
Lyrics: Nana Mizuki
Composition, arrangement: Takahiro Iida
You have a dream
Lyrics: Hiroko Koma
Composition: Yuuki Tsuruta
Arrangement: Junpei Fujita (Elements Garden)
BRAVE PHOENIX
Lyrics, composition, arrangement: Noriyasu Agematsu (Elements Garden)
Insert song for Magical Girl Lyrical Nanoha A's

Lyrics: Bee 
Composition, arrangement: Noriyasu Agematsu (Elements Garden)
SUPER GENERATION
Lyrics, composition: Nana Mizuki
Arrangement: Junpei Fujita
Naked Feels
Lyrics, composition, arrangement: Hayato Tanaka
Love Trippin'
Lyrics: Nana Mizuki
Composition, arrangement: Junpei Fujita
Late Summer Tale
Lyrics: Ryoji Sonoda
Composition, arrangement: Wataru Masachi
Violetta
Lyrics, composition: Nana Mizuki
Arrangement: Hitoshi Fujima
Primal Affection
Lyrics, composition, arrangement: Toshiro Yabuki

Lyrics: Bee 
Composition, arrangement: Noriyasu Agematsu
ETERNAL BLAZE
Lyrics: Nana Mizuki
Composition, arrangement: Noriyasu Agematsu
Opening theme for Magical Girl Lyrical Nanoha A's

Charts

DVD
Promo Video for Super Generation
The making of Hybrid Universe

References
Official website: NANA PARTY

2006 albums
Nana Mizuki albums